Festuca sodiroana is a species of grass in the family Poaceae. Its habitat spans from southern Ecuador to northern Colombia. It grows at an altitude of 2600–3800 meters in forest clearings and margins of brooks or rivers.

References

sodiroana
Flora of Ecuador
Least concern plants
Taxa named by Eduard Hackel
Taxonomy articles created by Polbot